The Chaunaca Formation is a Campanian geologic formation of Bolivia. Fossil sauropod tracks have been reported from the formation.

See also 
 List of dinosaur-bearing rock formations
 List of stratigraphic units with sauropodomorph tracks
 Sauropod tracks

References

Bibliography

Further reading 
 

Geologic formations of Bolivia
Upper Cretaceous Series of South America
Cretaceous Bolivia
Campanian Stage
Sandstone formations
Ichnofossiliferous formations
Fossiliferous stratigraphic units of South America
Paleontology in Bolivia
Formations